The Reverend Richard R. Jones (1853 – 1921) was a noted African-American Baptist minister, civil rights activist and orator in Roanoke, Virginia.

Early life
Richard Jones was born into slavery to his parents, William and Mary Jones, who were both owned by Matthew Pedigue of Botetourt County, Virginia. After the Civil War, he went to West Virginia, he experienced a religious conversion and a call to preach. He returned to Virginia and was baptized in Bedford County, Virginia, where he also entered public school to learn how to read. While in Bedford County, he preached at the Bunker Hill Baptist Church, and the Western Light Baptist Church and the Shady Grove Baptist Church, and to found the Piney Grove Baptist Church.

In 1884 he married Lelia Leftwich of Bedford County.

First Baptist Church
In 1882 he moved to Roanoke to help start the First Baptist Church. An aggressive and passionate speaker, he worked with the congregation to raise funds for the church building and parsonage, and became its first pastor.

"Born a slave in 1853, Reverend Richard R. Jones came to Roanoke in 1882 to head First Baptist Church. When completed in 1903 under exacting direction of Rev. Jones, the new First Baptist Church housed the largest black congregation west of Richmond. In 1901, the Roanoke Times condemned the outspoken ministry of Rev. Jones for disrupting "essential harmony between blacks and whites."  In 1904, a white mob of men and boys forced Rev. Jones to flee Roanoke, never to return."

Exile and death
When a white woman in Roanoke was attacked by a black man, tensions ran high. The Rev. Jones preached that whites were not superior to blacks, and in anger, a large mob of whites attacked his home on February 5, 1904, threatening him and his family. Forced out of his home in Roanoke, Virginia, he fled by train to Washington, DC, then to Homestead, Pennsylvania. There he began a $30,000.00 lawsuit against the town of Roanoke and the city police.

He subsequently died in Homestead and is buried in the Homestead Cemetery in Pittsburgh, Pennsylvania, next to his wife who later died in 1934.

References

1853 births
1921 deaths
People from Roanoke, Virginia
People from Bedford County, Virginia
Activists for African-American civil rights
African-American activists
African-American Baptist ministers
People from Homestead, Pennsylvania
Baptists from Virginia
Activists from Virginia
19th-century Baptist ministers from the United States
20th-century Baptist ministers from the United States